Demon Slayer: Kimetsu no Yaiba is a Japanese anime television series based on the manga series of the same name written and illustrated by Koyoharu Gotouge. The anime television series adaptation by Ufotable was announced in Weekly Shōnen Jump on June 4, 2018. The series aired from April 6 to September 28, 2019, on Tokyo MX, GTV, GYT, and BS11. The series is directed by Haruo Sotozaki, and the series' characters were designed by Akira Matsushima. The show is written by various Ufotable staff members and produced by Hikaru Kondo. The show's music is composed by Yuki Kajiura and Go Shiina.

The series is licensed by Aniplex of America and streamed Crunchyroll, Hulu, and FunimationNow. AnimeLab is simulcasting the series in Australia and New Zealand. The series ran for 26 episodes and adapted the manga from the beginning of the first volume to the first chapters of the seventh.

Prior to airing, the first five episodes screened theatrically in Japan for two weeks from March 29, 2019, under the title . Aniplex of America screened the film at the Aratani Theatre in Los Angeles on March 31, 2019. Madman Entertainment through AnimeLab screened the film in select theatres in Australia on April 2, 2019. In July 2019, it was announced that the series' English dub would air on Adult Swim's Toonami programming block; the dub would premiere on October 13, 2019.

A sequel film, titled Demon Slayer: Kimetsu no Yaiba – The Movie: Mugen Train, premiered on October 16, 2020, with the staff and cast reprising their roles.

A second season, covering the "Entertainment District" arc, was announced on February 14, 2021, with the staff and cast from the first season and film returning. Haruo Sotozaki returned as director, with character designs by Akira Matsushima and animation produced by Ufotable. In September 2021, it was announced that the second season will air for two cours throughout the Fall and Winter. On September 25, following the Fuji TV broadcast of the Mugen Train film, it was announced that the "Entertainment District" arc would premiere on December 5, and would be preceded by a television series recompilation of the "Mugen Train" arc that premiered on October 10, 2021.

At the end of the second season finale, it was announced that a third season, covering the "Swordsmith Village" arc, will be adapted into the television anime. It is set to premiere on April 9, 2023, with a one-hour special.

Series overview

Episode list

Season 1 (2019)

Season 2 (2021–22)

Season 3 (2023–scheduled)

Home media release
The series was released in Japan by Aniplex on eleven Blu-ray and DVD volumes beginning on July 31, 2019, and concluded on June 24, 2020. Each volume features cover art illustrated by the series' character designer, Akira Matsushima, and the limited-edition includes bonus CD containing original drama or soundtrack. Aniplex of America released the first limited-edition Blu-ray volume in North America on June 30, 2020, and the second volume was released on November 24, 2020. The company, in partnership with Funimation, released the standard-edition Blu-ray volumes in September 2020 and January 2021.

Japanese

English

Notes

References

External links
 Demon Slayer: Kimetsu no Yaiba at Crunchyroll
 

Demon Slayer: Kimetsu no Yaiba
Demon Slayer: Kimetsu no Yaiba